Dana Bay can really be considered as a sort of village with a mini supermarket, bakery, butchery, eating establishments, fuel station and liquor outlets amongst other small businesses and forms part of the greater Mossel Bay municipality. The village forms the west boundary of the Garden Route District, Western Cape, South Africa. Dana Bay lies approximately halfway between Port Elizabeth and Cape Town and is a mere 4 kilometers off the N2 highway. The central part of Mossel Bay is about 12 kilometers from Dana Bay.

There are no hotels in Dana Bay however there are multiple Bed and Breakfast establishments.

This area is exceptionally blessed to still host a variety of free roaming animals. It is not uncommon to find bushbuck, mongoose, tortoise, porcupine, guineafowl and Cape spurfowl visiting your garden. You may even find the grysbok if you are fortunate enough. There is a breeding pair of rock kestrel, jackal buzzard and on the cliffs not far is a pair of peregrine falcons. A list of common birds in the area is to be found below. Snakes are a regular occurrence such as Cape cobra and puffadder. The fire department plays an important role in capturing them and releasing them further away.

The bay frequently plays host to the Bryde's whale. From June to late October the southern right whale and humpback whale can be spotted quite often. It is a pleasure to watch the mother Humpback whale teach her youngsters to jump out of the water (whale breaching) and do some lobtailing, this is the act of beating the water with their tails.

On a fairly regular basis you will often see Bottlenose dolphin frolicking in the surf or a little further out in the bay. You will frequently watch the Cape Gannet's dive into the sea and then resurface a moment later with a fish in their beak.

The sunsets are absolutely stunning during the summer months.

Dana Bay is a recognised conservancy, hosting coastal and limestone varieties of fynbos and supporting one of the highest numbers of endemic species in the Cape Floristic Region.

The area is rich in history regarding the Khoisan people that found a home here and archeological findings date back almost 175,000 years.

Bird species to be found in the area include: Cape gannet, white-breasted cormorant, Cape cormorant, grey heron, hadeda ibis, black-shouldered kite, jackal buzzard, peregrine falcon, rock kestrel, Cape spurfowl, helmeted guineafowl, blue crane, African black oystercatcher, white-fronted plover, spotted thick-knee, kelp gull, Sandwich tern, speckled pigeon, red-eyed dove, laughing dove, Cape turtle dove, Knysna turaco not a common visitor, Burchell's coucal, spotted eagle-owl, speckled mousebird, red-faced mousebird, brown-hooded kingfisher, African hoopoe, barn swallow, greater striped swallow, rock martin, common house martin, fork-tailed drongo, pied crow, white-necked raven, Cape penduline tit, Cape bulbul, sombre greenbul, Cape rock thrush, Cape robin-chat, bar-throated apalis, tawny-flanked prinia, karoo prinia, fiscal flycatcher, paradise flycatcher, Cape wagtail, common fiscal, southern boubou, southern tchagra, bokmakierie, common starling, Cape sugarbird, malachite sunbird, southern double-collared sunbird, greater double-collared sunbird, amethyst sunbird, Cape white-eye, house sparrow, Cape sparrow, Cape weaver, yellow bishop, swee waxbill, pin-tailed whydah, Cape canary, yellow canary, streaky-headed seedeater, cardinal woodpecker and the Cape bunting.

References

Populated places in the Mossel Bay Local Municipality